Maurits Robert Delchot better known by his stage name Negativ (born 8 September 1982) is a Dutch rapper, actor and radio broadcaster of Surinamese origin from Amsterdam-Oost.

Negativ became part of the rap formation D-Men. He has also acted films like Bolletjes Blues and Complexx. He also has his own weekly radio show where he DJs for Juize FM on Fridays.

Beginnings
Maurits was interested at a very young age in rap. He started rapping with a bunch of friends, including  Keizer and others. He took part in fNally's band H.S.S. (Hinderlijke Straat Schoften). Soon he became known in the underground rap circuit taking part in several MC battles. One big battle faced him with Yukkie B, another rapper from Amsterdam-Oost (East Amsterdam). This led into several  quarrels between the two rappers, after which a series of diss tracks were sent back and forth between the two.

2003-2005: In D-Men

Negativ met Lange Frans already part of a band D-Men alongside his brother Brutus and  Bart Zeilstra known as Baas B, and convinced him to join D-Men in 2003, where he contributed greatly to the popular mixtapes of D-Men which were distributed free in the Amsterdam rap circuits, and downloadable online via the website www.straatremixes.tk On two tracks on this mixtape, he dissed the rapper B Yukkie. After the success of the De Straatremixes in 2003, two new mixtapes, De Straatremixes Deel 2 and De Straatremixes Deel 3 were released in 2004 again with contributions from Negativ.

Solo career
Shortly after the release of his single in January 2005, internal conflicts surfaced between Negativland and his two D-Men colleagues Lange Frans and Baas B who had now formed the duo Lange Frans & Baas B, so he decided to quit D-Men. A few weeks later, a Negativ made an online track and using an instrumental from 50 Cent, he dissed Lange Frans & Baas B. It was a time ramoant of diss recordings including many from The Opposites, Rmxcrew and Tuindorp Hustler Click (THC) dissing other rap acts. Another battle ensued between Negativ and THC in which Negativ recorded "Dacht je nou echt" ("Did you really"). Rapper Heist Rockah also dissed Negativ back. Negative answers him with the song  "Hou je bek" ("Shut up").

In 2005 Negativ took part also in the mixtape Urban Videoz and Straathits Volume 1 and Straathits Volume 2 with DJ MBA. On Loyalty Records he released the hit "Niets is wat het zijn moet" with Ebon-E. In 2005, he also had a joint single with Brutus in "Mijn Feestje"

In 2006 Negativ made his film debut, he plays the main character Spike in the movie Bolletjes Blues. For this role he was nominated for Golden Calf award at the Netherlands Film Festival in 2006.

In December 2006, Negativ received negative publicity after he was furious at the Tilburg festival threw a keyboard on the floor, resulting physical commotion to ensue.

In May 2008, during an interview with Propz Magazine, he confirmed that he had been recording tracks for the street remix 4 Mixtape, with other rappers Yes-R, Darryl, Lange Frans & Baas B.
On September 26, 2008 mixtape Hinderlijk (Annoying) was released via Juize.FM radio station, also bringing the single "Money Money Buit Buit". The song also featured on a new Dutch television series called Flow. BUT eventually he withdrew his support from the project saying that there was no quarrel,but that "the only reason why I make music because I like and I do not do anything to make money or because it would be useful for my career."

He was offered a television role as a prisoner in the telefilm Skin, and he starred in the TV series Flow and entered into the program Back2School.

In 2009, he released a single "Skud Skuddem' with a remix single featuring Yes-R, Ali B, Sjaak. He also appeared in a TV documentary about angry people.

Record label Nindo
In 2010 he founded his own record label Nindo, where he performed his mixtape Hinderlijker. Rapper Keizer, an old friend from earlier days also signed to the label. Later signed Bokoesam to the label

Awards / Nomination
Nominated in 2006 for Best actor Golden Calf award during the Netherlands Film Festival for his role in Bolletjes Blues

Personal life
Negativ became a father in 2006 of a daughter, Katie.

Discography

Albums

Mixtapes
2008: Hinderlijk Mixtape
2010: Hinderlijker Mixtape

Singles

Other releases
2008: "Money money buit buit"
2009: "Skud skuddem" (feat Sjaak, Ali B & Yes-R)

Featured in

Collaboration with D-Men
All mixtape releases are on D-Men Entertainment

2003: De straatremixes

2004: De Straatremixes Deel 2

2004: De Straatremixes Deel 3

Tracks on various compilation albums
2003: De Gastenlijst

2004: Dope Shit

2005: De Beste Nederhop

2005: NL Flavour

Tracks as a featured artist
2005: Yes-R - Mijn pad

2006: Kimo & Nina - De Nationale Overname Mixtape

2006: Nino - Transmigratie (mixtape)

2006: The Partysquad - De bazen van de club

2007: Nino - Transmigratie 2

2007: Nino - Transmigratie 3

2008: The Partysquad - Total Los! De Mixtape Vol. 1

2007: Reejon - Regen voor de storm

2008/2009: Nino - Stilte Voor De Storm

2009: Dicecream - De blaastest

2009: PUNA.NL - Propaganda

2009: Keizer - Straategisch

2010: Keizer - De oorzaak II

Diss tracks
Negativ has been at both ends of dissing tracks between rappers. Here are his diss track recordings

Film soundtracks
2006: Bolletjes Blues Original Soundtrack

Filmography
Feature films
2006: Bolletjes Blues as Spike 
2007: Complexx as Max
2008: "Grand Theft Auto 4" as Niko Bellic
2010: Gangsterboys
2012: Alleen maar nette mensen as Ryan
2013: "Hoe duur was de suiker" "as Cesar
2014:"kankerlijers" as Alfredo
2015: 'fissa de film'
Telefilms
2008: Skin (telefilm) as Gevangene
TV series
2008-2009: Flow as Nova
2014: StartUp as Smit
Documentaries
2009: Lucia Rijker onder boze jongeren as himself
Animated movies
2013: planes as "Teug"
2013: turbo as "Coole Kanjer"

References

External links
Official website

1982 births
Dutch rappers
Dutch people of Surinamese descent
Living people